M. Sue Kurita is an American judge. Kurita graduated from Loretto Academy in 1972. She holds a bachelor's degree from the University of Texas at El Paso (UTEP) and a master's degree in counseling from Webster University. During Kurita's first year at Texas Tech University School of Law, she was diagnosed with cancer before Spring Break. Kurita, who was raising her daughter on her own, underwent cancer treatments and the school provided support so she could finish her assignments on time. Kurita graduated law school in 1985. She passed the Texas bar in 1986. In 1998, she was appointed the Judge of the El Paso County Court at Law, No. 6.

In 2004, Kurita was elected as the vice president of the National Association of Women Judges. She is currently serving as vice chair of the Texas Supreme Court State Commission where is involved with several committees.

See also
List of Asian American jurists

References 

Year of birth missing (living people)
University of Texas at El Paso alumni
Webster University alumni
Texas Tech University School of Law alumni
People from El Paso, Texas
American women judges
Living people